USS LST-469 was a United States Navy  used in the Asiatic-Pacific Theater during World War II. As with many of her class, the ship was never named. Instead, she was referred to by her hull designation.

Construction
The ship was laid down on 23 October 1942, under United States Maritime Commission (MARCOM) contract, MC hull 989, by Kaiser Shipyards, Vancouver, Washington; launched 27 November 1942; and commissioned on 8 March 1943.

Service history  
During World War II, LST-469 was assigned to the Asiatic-Pacific theater.

Submarine attack 

On 16 June 1943, she was torpedoed by  while travelling in Convoy GP55 off the east coast of Australia. She was towed to the Cockatoo Island Dockyard, Sydney, where she was repaired in August 1943.

Pacific operations 
After being repaired she participated in the following operations, Hollandia operation in April 1944; the Western New Guinea operations, the Toem-Wakde-Sarmi area operation in May 1944, the Biak Islands operation in May and June 1944, the Noemfoor Island operation in July 1944, the Cape Sansapor operation in July and August 1944, and the Morotai landing in September 1944; the Leyte operation in October 1944; and the Lingayen Gulf landings in January 1945.

Following the war, LST-469 performed occupation duty in the Far East until 24 October 1945, and saw China service from 25 October to 2 November 1945. Upon her return to the United States, LST-469 was decommissioned on 27 March 1946, and struck from the Navy Directory on 1 May, that same year. On 13 December 1947, the tank landing ship was sold to Hughes Bros., Inc., New York City, for scrapping.

Honors and awards
LST-469 earned four battle stars for her World War II service.

Notes 

Citations

Bibliography 

Online resources

External links

LST-1-class tank landing ships of the United States Navy
1943 ships
World War II amphibious warfare vessels of the United States
S3-M2-K2 ships
Ships built in Vancouver, Washington